Marisol Medina  (born 11 May 1980) is an Argentine women's international footballer who plays as a forward. She is a member of the Argentina women's national football team. She was part of the team at the 2003 FIFA Women's World Cup.

References

1980 births
Living people
Argentine women's footballers
Argentina women's international footballers
Place of birth missing (living people)
2003 FIFA Women's World Cup players
Women's association football forwards
Footballers at the 2003 Pan American Games
Pan American Games competitors for Argentina